Zolostays is a real-tech co-living focused app that provides ready-to-move rooms/beds. It was founded in 2015 by Dr. Nikhil Sikri, Akhil Sikri and Sneha Choudhry.  Zolo focuses on the community aspect of co-living and organises online and offline events to bring the community together.

Zolostays competes with other co-living companies like Aarusha Homes, StayAbode, Ziroom, Xiangyu, Quartus, Koumkwat, Bikube and Oyo Living. During the pandemic, Zolo provided 75 of rent-free accommodation to those who lost their jobs. Zolo uses bulk inventory in usually residential township and ties up with real estate companies to make the rooms/beds available. Zolostays has both revenue sharing and leased model.  It uses Internet of Things technology for electricity and water billing.

History
Zolostays was founded in 2015 to solve the problem of students and young professionals who would move to temporarily go to other cities to study and work and look for affordable housing. In 2020, it was operating in 10 Indian cities. It has four round of funding, with total $ 98 Million.

Industry Background 
Cushman & Wakefield's report, titled 'Exploring the Student Housing Universe in India City Insights', found that there were over 9.08 million students who migrated to study in higher educational institutions in India during the 2018-19 academic year and needed suitable accommodation. The report also identified Delhi-NCR, Mumbai, and Pune as the three primary markets for student housing in the country, and these cities have a need for an additional 4.75 lakh beds from organized co-living operators to satisfy the current demand for student housing.

Competitions 
Zolostays competes with Stanza Living, Stayabode, Nestaway, etc.

References

External links
Hostels
Mobile applications
Zolostays Official Site
Student Accommodation